Night of the Living Dregs is the third album by Dixie Dregs, released in 1979. The first half of the album was recorded in the studio, and the second half at the Montreux Jazz Festival on July 23, 1978.

The album received a Grammy Award nomination for Best Rock Instrumental Performance.

"Country House Shuffle" and "Leprechaun Promenade" were previously released on the band's 1976 demo record The Great Spectacular.

The first four tracks are studio recordings, while the second four were recorded live at the Montreux Jazz Festival.

Track listing
 "Punk Sandwich" – 3:18
 "Country House Shuffle" – 4:13
 "The Riff Raff" – 3:17
 "Long Slow Distance" – 6:45
 "Night of the Living Dregs" – 4:21
 "The Bash" – 4:28
 "Leprechaun Promenade" – 3:46
 "Patchwork" – 4:53
All tracks composed by Steve Morse except "The Bash", by Morse/Morgenstein/Parrish/Sloan/West.

Personnel
Steve Morse – guitars
Andy West – bass
Allen Sloan – strings
Mark Parrish – keyboards
Rod Morgenstein – percussion

References

1979 albums
Dixie Dregs albums
Albums produced by Ken Scott
Capricorn Records albums
albums recorded at the Montreux Jazz Festival